A delta robot is a type of parallel robot that consists of three arms connected to universal joints at the base. The key design feature is the use of parallelograms in the arms, which maintains the orientation of the end effector. In contrast, Stewart platform can change the orientation of its end effector.

Delta robots have popular usage in picking and packaging in factories because they can be quite fast, some executing up to 300 picks per minute.

History 

The delta robot (a parallel arm robot) was invented in the early 1980s by a research team led by professor Reymond Clavel at the École Polytechnique Fédérale de Lausanne (EPFL, Switzerland). After a visit to a chocolate maker, a team member wanted to develop a robot to place pralines in their packages. The purpose of this new type of robot was to manipulate light and small objects at a very high speed, an industrial need at that time.

In 1987, the Swiss company Demaurex purchased a license for the delta robot and started the production of delta robots for the packaging industry. In 1991, Reymond Clavel presented his doctoral thesis 'Conception d'un robot parallèle rapide à 4 degrés de liberté', and received the golden robot award in 1999 for his work and development of the delta robot. Also in 1999, ABB Flexible Automation started selling its delta robot, the FlexPicker. By the end of 1999, delta robots were also sold by Sigpack Systems.

In 2017, researchers from Harvard's Microrobotics Lab miniaturized it with piezoelectric actuators to 0.43 grams for 15 mm x 15 mm x 20 mm, capable of moving a 1.3 g payload around a 7 cubic millimeter workspace with a 5 micrometers precision, reaching 0.45 m/s speeds with 215 m/s² accelerations and repeating patterns at 75 Hz.

Design 

The delta robot is a parallel robot, i.e. it consists of multiple kinematic chains connecting the base with the end-effector. The robot can also be seen as a spatial generalisation of a four-bar linkage.

The key concept of the delta robot is the use of parallelograms which restrict the movement of the end platform to pure translation, i.e. only movement in the X, Y or Z direction with no rotation.

The robot's base is mounted above the workspace and all the actuators are located on it. From the base, three middle jointed arms extend. The ends of these arms are connected to a small triangular platform. Actuation of the input links will move the triangular platform along the X, Y or Z direction. Actuation can be done with linear or rotational actuators, with or without reductions (direct drive).

Since the actuators are all located in the base, the arms can be made of a light composite material. As a result of this, the moving parts of the delta robot have a small inertia. This allows for very high speed and high accelerations. Having all the arms connected together to the end-effector increases the robot stiffness, but reduces its working volume.

The version developed by Reymond Clavel has four degrees of freedom: three translations and one rotation. In this case a fourth leg extends from the base to the middle of the triangular platform giving to the end effector a fourth, rotational degree of freedom around the vertical axis.

Currently other versions of the delta robot have been developed:
 Delta with 6 degrees of freedom: developed by the Fanuc company, in this robot a serial kinematic with 3 rotational degrees of freedom is placed on the end effector
 Delta with 4 degrees of freedom: developed by the Adept company, this robot has 4 parallelogram directly connected to the end-platform instead of having a fourth leg coming in the middle of the end-effector
 Pocket Delta: developed by the Swiss company Asyril SA, a 3-axis version of the delta robot adapted for flexible part feeding systems and other high-speed, high-precision applications.
 Delta direct drive: a 3 degrees of freedom delta robot having the motor directly connected to the arms. Accelerations can be very high, from 30 up to 100 g.
 Delta cube: developed by the EPFL university laboratory LSRO, a delta robot built in a monolithic design, having flexure-hinges joints. This robot is adapted for ultra-high-precision applications.
 Several "linear delta" arrangements have been developed where the motors drive linear actuators rather than rotating an arm. Such linear delta arrangements can have much larger working volumes than rotational delta arrangements.

The majority of delta robots use rotary actuators. Vertical linear actuators have recently been used (using a linear delta design) to produce a novel design of 3D printer. These offer advantages over conventional leadscrew-based 3D printers of quicker access to a larger build volume for a comparable investment in hardware.

Applications 

Industries that take advantage of the high speed of delta robots are the packaging industry, medical and pharmaceutical industry. For its stiffness it is also used for surgery. Other applications include high precision assembly operations in a clean room for electronic components. The structure of a delta robot can also be used to create haptic controllers. More recently, the technology has been adapted to 3D printers. These printers are faster and can be built for about 200 dollars and compete well with traditional Cartesian and CoreXY printers.

References 

Robot kinematics
Industrial robots
 
Parallel robots